Timothy John Harding (born 1 February 1978) is an Australian musician, singer, guitarist, entertainer and former member of the Australian children's musical group Hi-5. He left Hi-5 on November 14 2007, after nine years with the group due to suffering major injuries following a motorcycle accident.

Life and career 
Harding grew up in Sydney, Australia, with two younger brothers named Peter and James and attended St Andrew's Cathedral School. In 1993 he began a funk band Compos Mentis with his brother Peter, family friend Mike McCarthy and bass player Sam O'Donnell.
He does a Bit of Boxing and Surfing.
 In 1998 whilst studying social work at university, he auditioned for the children's musical group debut in Hi-5 from April 12, 1999. Harding was accepted and remained a core member of the group until he left the group after suffering a broken back and toes in a motorcycle accident at Eastern Creek Raceway earlier on December 19, 2007. He was replaced by Stevie Nicholson. Whilst Harding was in Hi-5, they won five ARIA Music Awards and three Logie Awards.

Harding lives in Newcastle with his wife Tash and daughters Arielle and Beatrix and works as a freelance entertainer and musician. He also sings with the Sydney-based weddings and functions band Soultraders. Harding also provided the voice for "Zip the Bird" in Cushion Kids.

References

External links

Soultraders - Live Wedding Band Sydney

1978 births
Living people
Australian children's musicians
Australian male dancers
Australian performers of Christian music
Australian rock guitarists
Australian Christians
21st-century Australian singers
21st-century guitarists
21st-century Australian male singers
Australian male guitarists